Durham High School may refer to:

 Durham High School (California) in Durham, California
 Durham High School (Kansas) in Durham, Kansas, merged with Hillsboro High School (Kansas) in 1960s
 Durham High School (North Carolina) in Durham, North Carolina
 Durham High School for Girls in Durham, England

See also
 Durham School (disambiguation)
 Durham (disambiguation)